Mictopsichia chirripoana is a species of moth of the family Tortricidae. It is found in Costa Rica.

References

Moths described in 2011
Mictopsichia
Moths of Central America
Taxa named by Józef Razowski